Luit Konwar Rudra Baruah was one of the foremost music pioneers of Assam. He was an actor, composer, lyricist, singer, and musician. He served with the Government of Assam in the Public Relations Department (since renamed as the Directorate of Information and Public Relations) and established the Culture & Film Division in the 1970s.

He was conferred the title Luit Konwar in honour of his sterling work towards the development of music and cinema in Assam.

He was born in Bhimor village near Puranigudam in Nagaon district in 1926 and lived in Guwahati later on.
He appeared in and directed music for several Assamese films and composed a lot of folk music in the local language. He died on 14 February 1980 leaving behind his wife and three sons.

Films
Kallol (Music Director)

Songs
Poka dhanor maje maje (lyrics, music)
Kauri pore (music)
Kasot kolochi haali jaali koon menoka aahe (lyrics, music)

References and notes

1926 births
1980 deaths
Indian male singer-songwriters
Indian singer-songwriters
Singers from Assam
People from Nagaon district
Indian Buddhists
20th-century Indian singers
20th-century Indian male singers